Jan Justus "Jan-Just" Bos (28 July 1939 – 24 March 2003) was a Dutch botanist, television presenter, and rower who competed in the 1960 and 1964 Summer Olympics.

Bos (Dutch for "forest") studied forestry at the Wageningen University. While a student in Wageningen, he was the coxwain of the Dutch coxed pair, which was eliminated in the repechage at the 1960 Olympics. Four years later he won a bronze medal in the same event, together with Erik Hartsuiker and Herman Rouwé.

From 1968 on he worked at his Wageningen University, becoming a faculty member of the department of plant systematics. He specialized in the flora of Sub-Saharan Africa and spent six years in South Africa, Liberia, Cameroon, and Ethiopia where he collected over 10,000 plants. In 1984 he defended a PhD on a study of the plants of the genus Dracaena in West Africa. In 1985 he led an expedition to Gabon.

In the 1980s he was a presenter for the Dutch nature television series Ja, natuurlijk ("Yes, naturally").

References

1939 births
2003 deaths
20th-century Dutch botanists
Dutch male rowers
Olympic bronze medalists for the Netherlands
Olympic medalists in rowing
Olympic rowers of the Netherlands
Rowers at the 1960 Summer Olympics
Rowers at the 1964 Summer Olympics
Wageningen University and Research alumni
Academic staff of Wageningen University and Research
People from Balikpapan
Sportspeople from East Kalimantan
Medalists at the 1964 Summer Olympics
Coxswains (rowing)